Minuscule 99 (in the Gregory-Aland numbering), ε 597 (von Soden), known as Codex Lipsiensis is a Greek minuscule manuscript of the New Testament, on parchment leaves. Palaeographically it has been assigned to the 15th or 16th century. The manuscript is very lacunose. It has marginalia and was adapted for liturgical use.

Description 

The codex contains a fragments of the Gospel of Matthew and Gospel of Luke on 22 leaves (size ). The text is written in one column per page, 21-23 lines per page (15.5 by 13.5 cm). To the present day only texts of Matthew 4:8-5:27; 6:2-15:30; Luke 1:1-13 have survived. The initial letters in red. Full of iotacism errors.

There is also a division according to the Ammonian Sections, no references to the Eusebian Canons.

Text 
The Greek text of the codex is a representative of the Byzantine text-type. Aland placed it in Category V. It was not examined by the Claremont Profile Method.

In Matthew 10:12 it reads λεγοντες ειρηνη τω οικω τουτω for αυτην – the reading is supported by manuscripts: Sinaiticus*,2, Bezae, Regius, Washingtonianus, Koridethi, Φ, f1, 22, 237, 251, 1010, (1424), ℓ 49, it vgcl.

History 

The manuscript was examined by Matthaei. Wettstein by number 99 designated Gregory's 155.

It is currently housed at the Leipzig University (Cod. Gr. 8), at Leipzig.

See also 

 List of New Testament minuscules
 Biblical manuscript
 Textual criticism
 Lectionary 178

References

Further reading 

 C. F. Matthaei, Novum Testamentum Graece et Latine (Riga 1782-1788). (as 18)

Greek New Testament minuscules
15th-century biblical manuscripts